Tillie Wakes Up, also known as Meal Ticket (Working title: Tillie's Night Out), is a 1917 American slapstick comedy film, and a quasi-sequel to Tillie's Punctured Romance (1914) and Tillie's Tomato Surprise (1915) starring Marie Dressler as Tillie for the third time, albeit with a different last name in Tillie Wakes Up, which could be explained by the fact that her character has been married. The film was produced by Peerless Pictures Studios and World Film Corporation, directed by Harry Davenport, and written by Frances Marion from a story by Mark Swan. The supporting cast features Johnny Hines, Frank Beamish, Rubye De Remer, Ruth Barrett and Jack Brawn.

The film takes place in the Coney Island amusement park.

Synopsis
Tillie and her neighbor Mr. Pipkins are both distraught over their respective marriages. One day, they sneak off to have a lively time at Coney Island. They flee the park together just as their spouses come to find them. After a chase, each is rescued from the ocean and reconcile with their respective spouses.

Cast
 Marie Dressler as Tillie Tinkelpaw
 Johnny Hines as J. Mortimer Pipkins
 Frank Beamish as Henry Tinkelpaw
 Rubye De Remer as Mrs. Luella Pipkins
 Ruth Barrett as Mrs. Nosey
 Jack Brawn as Mr. Nosey

References

External links

 
 

American silent feature films
American black-and-white films
American slapstick comedy films
Films set in amusement parks
1917 films
1917 comedy films
Films directed by Harry Davenport
World Film Company films
Films with screenplays by Frances Marion
1910s American films
Silent American comedy films
1910s English-language films